Hemibryomima is a genus of moths of the family Noctuidae first described by William Barnes and Foster Hendrickson Benjamin in 1927.

Species
 Hemibryomima chryselectra (Grote, 1880)
 Hemibryomima olivaria (Hampson, 1918)

References

Hadeninae